Sergei Pushkov (born 24 February 1964) is a retired ice hockey player who played in the Soviet Hockey League.  He played for SKA St. Petersburg.  He was inducted into the Russian and Soviet Hockey Hall of Fame in 1993.

External links
 Russian and Soviet Hockey Hall of Fame bio

1964 births
Living people
Russian ice hockey players
Soviet ice hockey players
SKA Saint Petersburg players
Vålerenga Ishockey players
Spektrum Flyers players
Storhamar Dragons players
Frisk Asker Ishockey players
Brynäs IF players
TuTo players
Russian expatriates in Norway
Ice hockey people from Saint Petersburg
Belarus men's national ice hockey team coaches